Vittorio Bernardo (born 2 February 1986) is an Italian football player. He plays for Dattilo Noir.

Club career
He made his Serie A debut for Messina on 28 November 2004 in a game against Fiorentina.

On 5 October 2018, he signed with an Eccellenza (fifth-tier) club Dattilo Noir.

References

External links
 

1986 births
People from Erice
Footballers from Sicily
Living people
Italian footballers
A.C.R. Messina players
S.S. Juve Stabia players
A.S. Martina Franca 1947 players
Cavese 1919 players
Latina Calcio 1932 players
A.S.D. Sorrento players
S.S. Teramo Calcio players
Paganese Calcio 1926 players
U.S. Catanzaro 1929 players
U.S. Viterbese 1908 players
A.S. Sambenedettese players
Serie A players
Serie B players
Serie C players
Serie D players
Association football forwards
Sportspeople from the Province of Trapani